John Lombardi may refer to:

 John V. Lombardi (born 1942), American educator & administrator
 John J. Lombardi (born 1952), American politician
Johnny Lombardi, Canadian broadcaster